A single banknote was issued by the Indian Princely State of Ambliara. It is undated. It is also a very rare note.

Catalogue number
PS201. 1 paisa (1 pice). ND. Black text on brown pressboard.

See also

Ambliara State

References

 

Ambliara